Antonio Matarrese (born 4 July 1940) is an Italian sports manager for football. He is known for having owned A.S. Bari for almost 20 years.

Family
His brothers also worked in notable positions. Giuseppe Matarrese, was the Bishop of Frascati from 1989 to 2009. Vincenzo Matarrese, was president of A.S. Bari, succeeding Antonio Matarrese, from 1983 to 2011, and Michele Matarrese also ran S. Matarrese Plc Group.

Career 
Matarrese graduated with a degree in business administration and he is Certified Public Accountant. He is CEO of the S. Matarrese Plc Group. During his career in sport field he has held a number of positions that include:
President of the Italian Football League from March 1982 to October 1987
President of the Italian Football Federation from 1987 to 1996
Member of the Organising Committee of the 1990 FIFA World Cup
UEFA Vice President from 1992 to 2002
FIFA Vice President from 1994 to 2002
President of the Organising Committee for the 1997 Mediterranean Games
Deputy Vice President of the Italian Football League during the presidency of Adriano Galliani from 2002 to 2004
President of the TV-platform Gioco Calcio until January 2004
President of UNIRE (National Horse Breeding Union) from September 2004 to May 2005

On 8 August 2006, he was elected President of the Italian Football League succeeding resigning president Adriano Galliani.

In May 2019, Matarrese was inducted into the Italian Football Hall of Fame for the 2018 edition of the ceremony, under the category football administrator.

References

Italian sports directors
1940 births
Living people
Italian chief executives